Mycobacterium lacus is a species of bacteria in the genus Mycobacterium known to be a causative agent in immunocompetent individuals.

Description
Large, dispersed acid-fast bacilli with prominent beading

Colony characteristics
Colonies on Löwenstein–Jensen medium were nonchromogenic, small, with a dry appearance.
On Middlebrook 7H10 agar, colonies are small, non-pigmented and smooth to rough, with a slightly irregular edge. Younger colonies appeared slightly transparent.

Physiology
Growth was observed on Löwenstein–Jensen medium at two weeks at both 37 and 42 °C and at 3 weeks at 30 °C. At four weeks, very little growth was observed at 25 °C, and no growth was observed at 52 °C.

Pathogenesis
The causative agent of bursitis in an immunocompetent individual.

Type strain
Isolated from synovial tissue from a 68-year-old female with bursitis of her right elbow. The likely exposure was in a lake.
Strain NRCM 00-255 = ATCC BAA-323 = DSM 44577

References

Turenne et al. 2002.  Mycobacterium lacus sp. nov., a novel slowly growing, non-chromogenic clinical isolate. Int. J. Syst. Evol. Microbiol., 52, 2135–2140.

External links
Type strain of Mycobacterium lacus at BacDive -  the Bacterial Diversity Metadatabase

Acid-fast bacilli
lacus
Bacteria described in 2002